Gustaf Adolf Vive Sparre, Swedish politician, Prime Minister for Justice 1848–56
Gustaf Sparre (speaker), Swedish politician, Speaker of Första kammaren 1896–1908